Consider This may refer to:
 Consider This (album), an album by Aaron Pritchett
 Consider This (EP), an EP by Tonight Alive
 Consider This (TV series), a weeknight current events talk show on Al Jazeera America
 Consider This (podcast), a daily NPR news podcast